Heloniopsis, also called swamppink, is a genus of plants in the Melanthiaceae, first described as a genus in 1859. It is native to east Asia (Japan, Taiwan, Korea, Sakhalin Island in Russia).

Species
 Heloniopsis kawanoi (Koidz.) Honda – Nansei-shoto
 Heloniopsis koreana Fuse, N.S.Lee & M.N.Tamura – Korean swamppink – Korea
 Heloniopsis leucantha (Koidz.) Honda – Nansei-shoto
 Heloniopsis orientalis (Thunb.) Tanaka – Korea, Sakhalin, Japan
 Heloniopsis orientalis var. flavida (Nakai) Ohwi – white oriental swamppink – Korea
 Heloniopsis tubiflora Fuse, N.S.Lee & M.N.Tamura – tubular-flower swamppink – Korea
 Heloniopsis umbellata Baker – Taiwan

References

External links
 Flora of China treatment

Melanthiaceae
Melanthiaceae genera